Vlokken (Dutch for flakes), also chocoladevlokken, is a commonly used sandwich topping in the Netherlands. A vlok is made of chocolate and is curved, its size is about 0.5 cm x 2 cm x 0.1 cm. (approx. ¼" x ¾" x 40 thous)

It is sold in different chocolate flavors, including dark, milk, white and a mix of those three.

See also

Muisjes
Nonpareils
Sprinkles
Pålægschokolade

References 

Chocolate
Dutch confectionery